Ankara Province is a province of Turkey with the capital city Ankara.

Demographics

History 

The site of the modern city has been home to settlements by many historic Anatolian civilizations in antiquity and classical times, including Phrygians, Lydians, Persians and Alexander the Great, Romans, and Galatians. The city of Ankara became a fortified stronghold of the Byzantines; it fell to the Seljuk Turks and later the Ottoman Empire. It was finally chosen by Mustafa Kemal Atatürk and the Turkish National Movement as the site of the provisional government and the Turkish parliament in 1920, and in 1923 as the capital city of the newly established Republic of Turkey.

Districts 
Ankara has 25 districts.

Geography 

Ankara is mostly in the Central Anatolia region, and partly in the Black Sea region. Ankara has mountain forests to its north, and the dry plain of Konya to its south. The province is irrigated by the Kızılırmak and Sakarya River systems, the Sarıyar reservoir and many natural lakes and pools. 50% of the land is used for agriculture, 28% is forest and another 10% is meadow and grazing land. Lake Tuz, the second largest lake in Turkey, partly lies in the Şereflikoçhisar district of the province. The highest point of the province is the 2,015 meters tall Işık Mountain in the Kızılcahamam district.

Climate 	
The climate is hot and dry in summer, rainy in spring and autumn, cold and snowy in winter, wetter in the north of the province than the drier plains to the south.

See also 

 Ankara Vilayet
 Ankara Eyalet

References

External links 

Ankara travel information